Dmytro Vitaliyovych Prikhna (born 6 June 1995) is a Ukrainian professional footballer who plays as a defensive midfielder for Polish club Radunia Stężyca.

References

External links
 Profile on Podillya Khmelnytskyi official website
 

1995 births
Living people
Sportspeople from Kharkiv Oblast
Ukrainian footballers
Association football midfielders
FC Mariupol players
SC Kakhovka players
FC Nyva Ternopil players
FC Metalist 1925 Kharkiv players
NK Veres Rivne players
SC Tavriya Simferopol players
FC Podillya Khmelnytskyi players
Ukrainian First League players
Ukrainian Second League players
III liga players
Ukrainian expatriate footballers
Expatriate footballers in Poland
Ukrainian expatriate sportspeople in Poland